Yun Sunji (1591–1666) was a scholar-official of the Joseon Dynasty Korea in the 17th century.

He was also diplomat and ambassador, representing Joseon interests in the 5th Edo period diplomatic mission to Japan.

1643 mission to Japan
In 1643, King Injo dispatched a mission to Japan.  This diplomatic mission functioned to the advantage of both the Japanese and the Koreans as a channel for developing a political foundation for trade.

This delegation was explicitly identified by the Joseon court as a "Communication Envoy" (tongsinsa).  The mission was understood to signify that relations were "normalized."

The Joseon embassy arrived at the shogunal court of Tokugawa Iemitsu in Edo on the 20th year of Kan'ei, according to the Japanese calendar in use at that time.  The embassy of Joseon king was led by Yun Sunji. 
This delegation was received in the court of Shōgun Tokugawa Iemitsu in Edo; and the mission also completed a visit to Shōgun Ieaysu's mausoleum at Nikkō.

Recognition in the West
Yun Sunji's historical significance was confirmed, when his mission was specifically mentioned in a widely distributed history published by the Oriental Translation Fund in 1834.

In the West, early published accounts of the Joseon kingdom are not extensive, but they are found in Sangoku Tsūran Zusetsu (published in Paris in 1832), and in Nihon ōdai ichiran (published in Paris in 1834).  Joseon foreign relations and diplomacy are explicitly referenced in the 1834 work.

See also
+ Joseon diplomacy
 Joseon missions to Japan
 Joseon tongsinsa

Notes

References

 Daehwan, Noh.  "The Eclectic Development of Neo-Confucianism and Statecraft from the 18th to the 19th Century," Korea Journal (Winter 2003).
 Lewis, James Bryant. (2003). Frontier contact between chosŏn Korea and Tokugawa Japan. London: Routledge. 
 Titsingh, Isaac, ed. (1834). [Siyun-sai Rin-siyo/Hayashi Gahō, 1652], Nipon o daï itsi ran; ou,  Annales des empereurs du Japon.  Paris: Oriental Translation Fund of Great Britain and Ireland.  OCLC  84067437
 Toby, Ronald P. (1991).  State and Diplomacy in Early Modern Japan: Asia in the Development of the Tokugawa Bakufu. Stanford: Stanford University Press. 
 Walker, Brett L.  "Foreign Affairs and Frontiers in Early Modern Japan: A Historiographical Essay," Early Modern Japan. Fall, 2002, pp. 44–62, 124-128.

External links
 Joseon Tongsinsa Cultural Exchange Association ; 
 조선통신사연구 (Journal of Studies in Joseon Tongsinsa) 

1591 births
1666 deaths
17th-century Korean people
Korean diplomats